Beaumont-la-Ronce is a former commune in the Indre-et-Loire department in central France. On 1 January 2017, it was merged into the new commune Beaumont-Louestault.

Population

See also
Communes of the Indre-et-Loire department

References

Former communes of Indre-et-Loire